HMS Sea Scout was a S-class submarine of the third batch built for the Royal Navy during World War II. She survived the war and was sold for scrap in 1965.

Design and description
The last 17 boats of the third batch were significantly modified from the earlier boats. They had a stronger hull, carried more fuel and their armament was revised. They displaced  on the surface and  submerged. The S-class submarines had a crew of 48 officers and ratings.

For surface running, the boats were powered by two  diesel engines, each driving one propeller shaft. When submerged each propeller was driven by a  electric motor. They could reach  on the surface and  underwater.

Sea Scout was armed with six 21 inch (533 mm) torpedo tubes in the bow. She carried six reload torpedoes for a grand total of a dozen torpedoes. Twelve mines could be carried in lieu of the torpedoes. The boat was also equipped with a 4-inch (102 mm) deck gun.

The submarine was named after the Sea Scout section of the Boy Scouts Association and incorporated the Scout fleur-de-lis emblem in her ships' badge.

Construction and career
HMS Sea Scout was built by Cammell Laird and launched on 24 March 1944. So far she has been the only ship of the Royal Navy to bear the name Sea Scout. She spent most of her wartime career in the Far East, where she sank numerous Japanese ships, including twelve sailing vessels, two coasters, two unidentified vessels, a sampan, a patrol vessel and a tug with five barges. She survived the Second World War, in 1953 taking part in the Fleet Review to celebrate the Coronation of Queen Elizabeth II. She was eventually sold and arrived at Swansea on 14 December 1965 for breaking up.

Notes

References
 
  
 
 
 

 

British S-class submarines (1931)
1944 ships
World War II submarines of the United Kingdom
Ships built on the River Mersey
Royal Navy ship names